A presidential inauguration is a ceremonial event centered on the formal transition of a new president into office, usually in democracies where this official has been elected. Frequently, this involves the swearing of an oath of office.

Examples of presidential inaugurations include:
Brazilian presidential inauguration
French presidential inauguration
Irish presidential inauguration
Philippine presidential inauguration
Russian presidential inauguration
United States presidential inauguration

Ceremonies